Rodrigo Muñoz de Guzmán or Rodrigo Núñez de Guzmán (died ca. 1186), considered the common ancestor of the noble house of Guzmán, was a  Castilian magnate and tenente of Roa and of the village of Guzmán in Burgos, from which this lineage took its name.

Life 
Nothing is known about the parentage or ancestry of Rodrigo Muñoz de Guzmán. The onomastic customs of that time dictate that, given his patronymic Muñoz, he must have been the son of a Munio (Muño) or Nuño. He was a patron of several monasteries, including the Monastery of San Cosme and San Damián in Covarrubias and of the Monastery of San Cristóbal de Ibeas situated in San Millán de Juarros which had been founded by Álvaro Díaz de Oca and his wife Teresa Ordóñez, the maternal grandparents of his wife Mayor. Rodrigo and Mayor were buried there. On 20 February 1151, Gutierre Fernández de Castro with his wife Toda, and Rodrigo and his wife Mayor, Toda's sister, donated several properties that the sisters had inherited from their maternal grandparents, to the abbot of the monastery.

Rodrigo Muñoz probably died shortly after 29 January 1186, the date when he last appears in medieval charters.

Marriage and issue 

He married before 1150 Mayor Díaz, daughter of Diego Sánchez, who died in the Battle of Uclés, and of Enderquina Álvarez, daughter of Álvaro Díaz de Oca and his wife Teresa Ordóñez. At least nine children were born of this marriage:

 Álvaro Rodríguez de Guzmán (died in 1187), governed, as tenant-in-chief,  Mansilla, a toponymic which he adopted as his cognomen  and as such he appears confirming several charters as Álvaro Rodríguez de Mansilla. He also governed La Pernía and Liébana.  Álvaro married Sancha Rodríguez de Castro, daughter of Rodrigo Fernández de Castro, the Bald and Eylo Álvarez with whom he had Fernando and Eylo Álvarez, as well as Elvira and Toda Álvarez de Guzmán, the latter married to Álvaro Rodríguez Girón, son of Rodrigo Gutiérrez Girón.
 Fernando Rodríguez de Guzmán, who, according to genealogist Luis de Salazar y Castro, was the husband of Juana de Aza and father of Saint Dominic, although there is no documentary proof whatsoever sustaining this filiation.
 Nuño or Munio Rodríguez de Guzmán, who probably died young, shortly after August 1151 when he last appears confirming a donation made by King Sancho III of Castile.
 Pedro Rodríguez de Guzmán (died on 18 July 1195 at the Battle of Alarcos). Appointed mayordomo mayor of King Alfonso VIII in April 1194.  Around May 1174 he married Mahalda, as confirmed in the donation made by King Alfonso VIII in casamento (as a wedding gift). The couple had several children, including Nuño Pérez de Guzmán who was the head of the house of Guzmán, and Guillén Pérez de Guzmán, the father of Mayor Guillén de Guzmán, mistress of King Alfonso X of Castile, the parents of Beatrice of Castile, queen consort of Portugal due to her marriage to King Afonso. 
 Rodrigo Rodríguez de Guzmán, mentioned by his brother Álvaro in 1167. 
 Urraca Rodríguez de Guzmán (died after 1189), who married Pedro Rodríguez de Castro. Both appear together in 1189 when they donated Villasila and Villamelendro to the Order of Santiago, confirming as ego Petrus Roderici de Castro cum uxore mea Urraca Roderici (I, Pedro Rodríguez de Castro with my wife Urraca Rodríguez)
 Sancha Rodríguez de Guzmán, mentioned by her brother Álvaro in 1167.
 María de Guzmán, was the first wife of Rodrigo Gutiérrez Girón.
 Teresa Rodríguez de Guzmán, also mentioned by her brother Álvaro in 1167.

Notes

References

Bibliography

External links 
   Románico Digital,  San Millán de Juarros.  Ruins of the Monastery of San Cristóbal de Ibeas

12th-century births
1186 deaths
12th-century nobility from León and Castile